The Big JAB is the name of 2 sports radio stations in southern Maine, owned by Atlantic Coast Radio. It is heard on 1440 AM (WRED, licensed to Westbrook) and 96.3 FM (WJJB-FM, licensed to Gray).  The stations air local sports talk hosts Monday through Friday 6am to 6pm.  The Morning Jab features Dave “Shoe” Schumacher and Joe Palmieri from 6am to 10am. Middays feature Middays with Mannix and Mannix from 10am to 2pm (Jeff and Taylor Mannix). The PM Jab features Javier Gorriti and Eli Canfield from 2pm to 6pm. Fox Sports Radio provides programming nights and weekends. In July 2017 Atlantic Coast Radio purchased a 250-watt translator at 92.5 MHz from Augusta, ME-based Light of Life Ministries to further augment its Portland-area FM signal.

Studios and offices are located on 779 Warren Avenue in Portland, Maine.  The AM transmitter is off Juniper Lane in Westbrook.  The FM transmitter is near King Hill Road in South Paris, Maine.

History

1440 History 
The 1440 frequency first went on the air November 8, 1959 as WJAB.  At first it was a daytime only station playing top 40 music, giving major competition to cross-town Top 40 leader 1310 WLOB.  WJAB quickly became the top rated Top 40 station in Portland, a position it held until 1965, when a resurgent WLOB, after having obtained night power, retook the top spot.  In 1974, WJAB launched a similarly-formatted FM simulcast on 106.3 WJBQ-FM, to allow listeners with FM radios to hear the station around the clock.   The WJBQ call sign was eventually added to the AM station as well.  In  1980, WJBQ-FM relocated to 97.9 in a frequency swap with classical music station WDCS, a predecessor to WBACH.  (106.3 is now occupied by WHXR.)

In the intervening years, the AM station would attempt several formats, including all-news (as WMER), a simulcast of what had become WWGT-FM (as WWGT), and an affiliation with the hard rock/heavy metal Z Rock Network (as WLPZ).  In the mid-1990s, the station settled on its current sports format; initially retaining the WLPZ call letters.  It became WJAE in 1997 in an attempt to restore the WJAB identity to the station.  (The station could not reclaim the original call sign because it was now being used by a station in Alabama.)  (-owners Bob Fuller and J. J. Jeffrey had previously worked at WJAB during the 1960s.  Jeffrey retained WJAE by way of Atlantic Coast Radio upon the sale of Fuller-Jeffrey's FM stations to Citadel Broadcasting in 1999.

96.3 History 
The 96.3 frequency debuted in 1975 as WRUM-FM, call letters derived from its former city of license, Rumford. In 1981, the call letters were changed to WWMR, and by 1983 the format was a high-energy top 40/AOR hybrid with live DJs and the branding "96 WMR."  Additionally, the station's power was boosted significantly, giving it wider coverage in Central Maine.  In 1987, WWMR-FM was sold to Carter Broadcasting, and the station adopted a religious format.  Carter eventually consolidated the operations of WWMR with that of sister station 1310 WLOB, and in 1997 the call sign was changed to WLOB-FM.  After WLOB and WLOB-FM were sold to Atlantic Coast Radio in 2000, the religious programming was discontinued in favor of a news-talk format. In 2006, WLOB-FM relocated its transmitter from western Maine to South Paris to provide a clearer signal to the Portland media market. Following the transmitter move, in 2008 WLOB-FM changed its city of license from Rumford to Gray.  On August 25, 2008, WLOB-FM converted from the WLOB simulcast to an all-sports simulcast of The Big JAB.

From 1999 to 2008, the Big JAB's programming was also heard on 900 AM WJJB, licensed to Brunswick.  In 2008, that frequency became WWBK and the WJJB call sign subsequently moved to 1440.  AM 900 was sold to Bob Bittner (owner of WJIB and WJTO) for $27,000.

Additionally, from 2000 to 2008, The Big JAB's FM frequency was on 95.5.  Initially, the station continued to broadcast under its previous WCLZ call letters.  On September 1, 2008, 95.5 began airing programming from Boston sports station WEEI in a simulcast with 95.9 WPEI  95.5 began using the call letters WGEI.  95.5 has since switched call signs to WPPI.

Stations

Programming 
 The Morning JAB with David "Shoe" Schumacher and Joe Palmieri 
The PM JAB with Javier Gorriti and Eli Canfield
Middays with Mannix and Mannix
Boston Red Sox baseball, from the Red Sox Radio Network
Fox Sports Radio (with SportsMap carried for sports updates during local programming)
Maine Red Claws basketball
selected Maine State Championship football games

Former hosts/shows 
Frank Fixaris

Co-owned stations 
WLOB 1310 AM, Licensed to Portland, Maine, currently a talk format.
WPEI 95.9 FM, Licensed to Saco, Maine, part of the WEEI Radio Network
WPPI 95.5 FM, Licensed to Topsham, Maine, part of the WEEI Radio Network

References

External links
WJAB's Website

Sports radio in the United States
Radio stations established in 1959

1959 establishments in Maine
Fox Sports Radio stations